Sky Prime Aviation Services is a private charter airline based in Riyadh, Saudi Arabia operating domestic and international scheduled and charter services, along with parent company Alpha Star Aviation. Its main base is King Khalid International Airport.

Fleet

The Sky Prime fleet consists of the following aircraft (as of April 2018):

References

External links

Airlines of Saudi Arabia
Airlines established in 2016
Saudi Arabian companies established in 2016
2016 establishments in Saudi Arabia